Thanakorn Pichitchaipojanart is a professional footballer from Thailand. He currently plays for Bangkok United in the Thailand Premier League.

External links
Profile at Thaipremierleague.co.th

Living people
Thanakorn Pichitchaipojanart
1986 births
Thanakorn Pichitchaipojanart
Association football midfielders
Thanakorn Pichitchaipojanart